Knifepoint Horror is a supernatural suspense podcast created, written, and produced by Soren Narnia. Its sporadically-uploaded episodes, which average nearly an hour in length, feature first-person narrations (often by Narnia himself) and are notable for their highly minimalist production, especially in their use of sound effects and music. Adapted into various formats, the podcast has received critical acclaim since its release and has been widely ranked among the best horror podcasts of all time.

About 
The podcast premiered on November 23rd, 2010, with the story "town". In a departure from the format it later adopted, the story was narrated by voice actor Dennis Smith instead of Narnia. 

The featured stories are listed under Creative Commons Attribution-NonCommercial-ShareAlike CC BY-NC-SA.

The show took an extended hiatus starting in February 2012, causing some of Narnia's fellow podcasters to theorize it had been canceled due to a lack of updates. However, it returned in June 2013 and has retained a consistent upload schedule since.

The podcast's cover art is a detail of a demon from the third section of Hieronymus Bosch's medieval triptych The Garden of Earthly Delights. In the description of the episode "A Quick Trilogy of Terror", Narnia featured a short, humorous story written by 11-year-old fan Ethien Duckett explaining the fictional origins of the creature, dubbing it the "Ratbat".

Format

Using "the limitations of audio as a strength", each Knifepoint Horror episode typically features a single standalone horror story, narrated by Narnia, with minimal music, sound effects, and background noise. The narration is done from a first-person point of view. The title of each story is usually a single, lowercase word such as "staircase", "laborer", "school", or "corpse". Occasionally, titles will include uppercase letters or feature more than one word, signaling the appearance of more than one narrator and increased music and sound effects. These include "The Crack", "Twelve Tiny Cabins", and "Let No One Walk Beside Her".

Influences 
In an interview with jupitercutter, Narnia listed works such as Dracula, "The Monkey's Paw" and "The Yellow Wallpaper", as well as the works of authors such as Joyce Carol Oates, H. P. Lovecraft, Stephen King, M. R. James, Ray Bradbury and Clive Barker as being influential on his style of writing. In the same interview, he also singled out William Friedkin's 1973 adaptation of The Exorcist as being "the biggest single influence on me when it comes to horror. Watching that revealed to me at age 10, when it came on TV one night, that if you want a horror story to be truly frightening, you have to make it seem like you believe it all happened, presenting it with total sincerity and rationality."

Music 
The podcast uses royalty-free music by Kevin MacLeod.

List of Episodes 
All episodes are written and narrated by Soren Narnia, except where noted.

Adaptations 
In November 2019, the podcast was adapted into a graphic novel titled Knifepoint Horror Anthology: Eight Tales of Terror, which was illustrated by V.V. Glass, Adam Cadwell, John J. Pearson, and five other artists. Specifically, it features the stories "Let No One Walk Beside Her", "thrifting", "visitation", "west", "moonkeeper", "trail", "lake", and "sisters". 

The podcast has also been adapted into books as well:
 

The story "staircase" has been adapted twice into a short film under a different title. The Thing from the Hallway, directed by Tony J. Rivas and starring Mike Bash and Hilary Barraford, was released in March 2018 and later won a Silver Spotlight award. Neighborhood Watch, directed by Nolan Sordyl and starring Cody McGlashan and Joanna McGinley, was released in October 2021.

Reception 
Knifepoint Horror has received critical acclaim from numerous online sources over the years, many of whom have ranked it among the best or scariest horror podcasts of all time. In 2014, The A.V. Club wrote that the show's "minimalist style is meant to resemble old-fashioned campfire stories, but campfire stories were never this unsettling. Narnia is gifted with a direct voice and a mind for terrifying setups." Vox's Aja Romano made similar observations three years later, writing: "For sheer chills-around-the-campfire-style storytelling, nothing beats Knifepoint [...] its effectiveness derives partly from its minimalism, and the way creator Soren Narnia allows the silence to fill your mind with terror." In 2021, Romano wrote another Vox article on the podcast, as a part of the website's 'One Good Thing' series, in which she observed: "Over the years, Knifepoint Horror has gained a small but dedicated fan following, and I think that’s in part because there’s something deeply brave about Knifepoint as a creative exercise. Many of the stories feel as though they’re being spun aloud, impromptu. [...] That makes every story in Knifepoint Horror feel like a triumph, a rough diamond of creative expression that dares to speak itself aloud, flaws and all — to exist in the tense space between Soren Narnia’s brain and a judgmental audience steeped in horror tropes. Except somehow, defying all odds, the rough diamond is always brilliant, sparkling in the dark." Sara Century, writing for Los Angeles Review of Books' '''Podcast Review' in 2020, noted that its "tales are more like character studies than anything else, so by the time you make it to “the scary part,” it’s all the more effective as it comes as a complete surprise." "Among horror podcasts", she concluded, "KPH is one of the most consistently unsettling."

Influence
Jonathan Sims cites Knifepoint Horror as one of the influences behind his writing on horror podcast The Magnus Archives.''

See also 

 Horror podcast
 List of horror podcasts

References

External links 

 

jupitercutter interview with Soren Narnia

Audio podcasts
2010 podcast debuts
Horror podcasts
Patreon creators
Creative Commons-licensed podcasts
Monologue podcasts